The 2019–20 South Dakota Coyotes women's basketball represent University of South Dakota in the 2019–20 NCAA Division I women's basketball season. The Coyotes, are led by fourth year head coach Dawn Plitzuweit, compete in the Summit League. They play home games in Sanford Coyote Sports Center in Vermillion, South Dakota. The Coyotes finished the season ranked 17th in the AP Poll and eleventh in the coaches poll. It was the highest finish by any Summit League team and were in the top 25 ranking for 16 straight weeks, also setting a record.

Previous season
The Coyotes went 28–6 overall and 14–2 in Summit League play. At one point during the season South Dakota were ranked for the first time in school history. In the Summit League Tournament the Coyotes reached the championship game for the sixth time in the last seven years and would again face South Dakota State for the fifth time in those six years. South Dakota reached the NCAA tournament, after the Summit League tournament loss to South Dakota State, as an at-large bid in the Portland Regional as a number 8 seed. They would face off against the Clemson but end up losing 79–66.

Offseason

Departures

Roster

Schedule

|-
!colspan=9 style=| Non-conference regular season

|-
!colspan=9 style=| Summit League Regular Season

|-
!colspan=9 style=| Summit League Women's Tournament

Rankings
2019–20 NCAA Division I women's basketball rankings

References

South Dakota Coyotes women's basketball seasons
South Dakota
South Dakota Coyotes women's basketball
South Dakota Coyotes women's basketball